Kristian Popovic (born 14 August 2001) is an Australian professional footballer who plays as a defensive midfielder for  NK Međimurje.

Club career

Perth Glory
On 18 April 2019, at 17 years of age, Kristian Popovic made his first appearance for Perth Glory coming on as a substitute for Jake Brimmer. On 19 October 2019, Popovic scored his first professional goal, coming against Western United in a 1–1 draw.

Career statistics

Personal life
Popovic is the son of former Crystal Palace and Socceroos player Tony Popovic, and the older brother of Perth Glory player Gabriel Popovic.

Honours

International
Australia U20
AFF U-19 Youth Championship: 2019

References

External links

2001 births
Living people
Australian people of Croatian descent
Association football defenders
Association football midfielders
Australian soccer players
Australia under-20 international soccer players
Australia under-23 international soccer players
Perth Glory FC players
Xanthi F.C. players
NK Rudeš players
NK Međimurje players
A-League Men players
Super League Greece 2 players
First Football League (Croatia) players
Second Football League (Croatia) players
Australian expatriate soccer players
Expatriate footballers in Greece
Australian expatriate sportspeople in Greece
Expatriate footballers in Croatia
Australian expatriate sportspeople in Croatia